{{Album ratings
| ADM = 6.6/10
| MC = 69/100
| rev1 = AllMusic
| rev1score = 
| rev2 = The A.V. Club
| rev2score = B
| rev3 = DIY| rev3score = 
| rev4 = Exclaim!
| rev4score = 7/10
| rev5 = Spin
| rev5score = 5/10
| rev6 = Under the Radar
| rev6score = 7.5/10
}}White Is Relic/Irrealis Mood''''' is the fifteenth studio album by American indie rock band of Montreal, released on March 9, 2018.

Music
Singer Kevin Barnes said the album's sound was influenced by 1980s-style "extended dance mixes" and explained that he "also decided to abandon the 'live band in a room' approach." Barnes listed Angela Davis, Noam Chomsky, Chris Kraus, Ta-Nehisi Coates, Malcolm X, and Mark E. Smith as lyrical influences.

Track listing

Charts

References

2018 albums
Of Montreal albums
Polyvinyl Record Co. albums